The 1996–97 Atlante F.C. season was the 5th season since the team's last promotion to Primera División. Atlante competed in Primera División and Copa México

Coaching staff

Players

Squad information

Players and squad numbers last updated on 31 January 2019.Note: Flags indicate national team as has been defined under FIFA eligibility rules. Players may hold more than one non-FIFA nationality.

Competitions

Overview

Torneo Invierno

League table

Results summary

Torneo Verano

League table

Results summary

Statistics

Goals

Clean sheets

References

Atlante F.C. seasons
1996–97 Mexican Primera División season
1996–97 in Mexican football